Gayletter, often stylized as GAYLETTER, is a biannual print magazine and weekly email newsletter chronicling queer art, culture and nightlife in New York City. Founded in 2008 by Tom Jackson and Abi Benitez, Gayletter began as a weekly guide to alternative gay and queer events in New York. In 2014, Gayletter launched a printed magazine and website covering a range of expanded topics such as fashion, music, art, and literature.

Associated figures 
The magazine has published original artwork, photography, interviews, and stories from a panoply of queer artists, designers, and nightlife personalities such as Tyler Akers, Kevin Aranibar, James Bidgood, Justin V. Bond, Jay Boogie, Elliott Jerome Brown, Jr., Renée Cox, Austin Dale, Jimmy De Sanna, Andrej Dúbravsky, Ian Faden, Alex Fiahlo, Jim French, Nash Glynn, Ren Hang, House of Ladosha, Brian Kenny, Cakes da Killa, Naruki Kukita, Bruce LaBruce, Amanda Lepore, Eric Lotzer, McDermott & McGough, Bob Mizer, Slava Mogutin, Zanele Muholi, Frank Ocean, Jack Pierson, Gio Black Peter, Debarati Sanyal, Paul Mpagi Sepuya, Laurie Simmons, Manuel Solano, Casey Spooner, Mickalene Thomas, Luis Venegas, Brian Vu, David Wojnarowicz, and Zena Zipora.

In April 2019, singer and producer Frank Ocean did a rare interview with Gayletter.

In 2021, Gayletter and Loewe organized an event at Twist, a gay club in Miami, for the release of a book of paintings by the painter Florian Krewer.

References

External links
 

LGBT literature in the United States